The  is an indoor sporting arena in Higashi-ku, Sapporo, Hokkaido, Japan.

It was built in October 1970, and has an area of 6,267 m² in total. Mikaho Gymnasium was one of the venues for figure skating at the 11th Winter Olympic Games held in Sapporo in February 1972.

The gym is currently used as a skating rink in winter (for figure skating, leisure skating and curling), and as a gym in the summer months. After the Olympics, it was shortly used as a heated swimming pool in the summer.
 
It is located next to three baseball diamonds, and four tennis courts.

Access
The gymnasium is 10 minutes' walk from Kita-Nijūyo-Jō Station on the Namboku Line.

References
  
 Official Sapporo City website

Venues of the 1972 Winter Olympics
Olympic figure skating venues
Indoor arenas in Japan
Sports venues completed in 1972
Sports venues in Sapporo
2017 Asian Winter Games Venues